Angharad is a feminine given name in the Welsh language, having a long association with Welsh royalty, history and myth. It translates to English as much loved one. In Welsh mythology, Angharad Golden-Hand is the lover of Peredur in the myth cycle The Mabinogion.

Historical figures
There have been a number of historical or semi-historical Angharads, most notably the daughter of Owain Gwynedd (1100–1170), King of Gwynedd, who married Gruffydd Maelor. Other historical Angharads include ( signifies 'daughter of'):
 Angharad ferch Owain (1065–1162), wife of Gruffudd ap Cynan, Prince of Gwynedd
 Angharad ferch Meurig, wife of Rhodri the Great (820–878)
 Angharad ferch Llywelyn, daughter of Llywelyn the Great (1173–1240), Prince of Wales
 Angharad ferch Madog ap Gruffydd Maelor, sister to Gruffydd II ap Madog, Lord of Dinas Bran
 Angharad ferch Maredudd ab Owain, wife of Llywelyn ap Seisyll, King of Gwynedd and of Deheubarth
 Angharad ferch Rhys ap Gruffydd (1132–1197)
 Angharad ferch Gruffydd II ap Madog, Lord of Dinas Bran
 Angharad of Brittany, wife of Idwal Iwrch 
 Angharad, daughter of Rhydderch Hael, a 6th-century king of Strathclyde

People
Angharad Gatehouse (born 1954), British entomologist
Angharad James (poet) (1677–1749), Welsh poet
Angharad James (footballer) (born 1994), Welsh football player
Angharad Llwyd (1780–1866), Welsh historian
Angharad Mair (born 1960), Welsh television presenter
Angharad Mason (born 1979), Welsh cyclist
Angharad Price (born 1972), Welsh academic and novelist
Angharad Rees (1944–2012), Welsh actress
Angharad Tomos (born 1958), Welsh author

Fiction
 Angharad, mother of Princess Eilonwy in Lloyd Alexander's fictional land of Prydain
 Angharad, fictional character in The Rowan by Anne McCaffrey
 Angharad, fictional character in The Blue Sword by Robin McKinley
 Angharad, fictional character in Into the Green by Charles de Lint
 Angharad, fictional character in Juniper by Monica Furlong
 Angharad, fictional character in How Green Was My Valley by Richard Llewellyn
 Angharad, fictional character in the King Raven Trilogy, by Stephen R. Lawhead
 Angharad, fictional character in Monk's Hood by Ellis Peters
 The Splendid Angharad, fictional character in the film Mad Max: Fury Road, played by Rosie Huntington-Whiteley
 Angharrad, fictional horse in the young adult series Chaos Walking by Patrick Ness
 Angharad, sister of fictional character David in the book The Blue Rose by Kate Forsyth
Angharad is Queen Guenièvre's lady's maid in the television series Kaamelott
 Angharad Scott, fictional character in the book Piranesi (novel) by Susanna Clarke
 Angharradh goddess in elven pantheon of Seldarine in Dungeons and Dragons system

References

Welsh feminine given names
Welsh royalty